François D'Onofrio (born 6 October 1990), also known as Francesco D'Onofrio, is a Belgian former professional footballer. He also holds Italian citizenship.

Club career
He made his professional debut in the Belgian First Division A for Standard Liège on 27 November 2010 in a game against Lierse.

In the summer 2018, D'Onofrio joined Lierse Kempenzonen. In January 2020, he was sent down to Lierse's B-team alongside Kassim Doumbia.

D'Onofrio retired from playing in November 2022.

References

External links
 François D'Onofrio at ZeroZero

1990 births
Footballers from Liège
Belgian people of Italian descent
Living people
Belgian footballers
Association football defenders
Standard Liège players
S.C. Olhanense players
R.F.C. Seraing (1922) players
F.C. Penafiel players
Lierse Kempenzonen players
Belgian Pro League players
Challenger Pro League players
Primeira Liga players
Belgian expatriate footballers
Expatriate footballers in Portugal
Belgian expatriate sportspeople in Portugal